The Naf River ( Naf Nodi ;) is an international river marking the border of southeastern Bangladesh and northwestern Myanmar.

Geography
Its width varies from 1.61 km to 3.22 km. 

It flows into the Bay of Bengal in the Indian Ocean, between the Bangladeshi Cox's Bazar District of the Chittagong Division, and the Burmese Rakhine State.

Historically, Shapuree Island, located at the mouth of the river, has played an important role territorially. It is considered one of the immediate causes for the first Anglo-Burmese War. St. Martin's Island is also at the river's mouth.

River incidents with fishermen and refugees
Regular incidents in which fishermen and Burmese refugees are shot by the Tatmadaw (Myanmar Armed Forces), and/or refugees are escorted back to Myanmar by Bangladeshi troops have occurred on the Naf River.
These include but are not limited to the following events:
 February 1992 — The Lun Htin, A Burmese paramilitary force, killed 20 refugees who were crossing the Naf River to Bangladesh.
 24 March 1994 — Members of the Myanmar Army's Western Military Command patrolling the Naf River found a group of Rohingya Muslims fishing from a small country boat. The soldiers tried to extort money from the fishermen, but when they were unable to do so, tied them up with rope and brought them to Balu Khali village in Maungdaw Township. Eight of the Rohingya fishermen were interrogated and tortured for five days, and then they were all shot by firing squad. 
 8 January 2000 — a three day skirmish.
 27 October 2001 — Burmese border troops killed one Bangladeshi man, wounded 2, and abducted 13 while they were fishing in the Naf River.
 22 January 2005 — 70 people were shot and killed when Burmese border guards opened fire on a group of 50 boats attempting to cross the Naf River. The border guards claimed that they believed the boats contained "smuggled rice," implying that their actions, culminating in the mass shooting of unarmed people, were justified.
 June 2012 — thousands of Rohingya Muslims fleeing sectarian violence in Rakhine State sought refuge across the Naf River in the Chittagong Division of Bangladesh, though they were often escorted back by Bangladeshi troops. On 11 July 2012, Burmese President Thein Sein suggested expelling the Rohingya people from Myanmar or having the UN relocate the 300,000 Rohingya people living in Myanmar, a policy the UN quickly rejected.
 August 2017 — The Border Guard Bangladesh station chief of the Ghumdum border post in Bangladesh accused Myanmar's military of firing on fleeing Rohingyas crossing the Naf River. An AFP reporter counted more than a dozen mortar shells and several heavy machine gun rounds fired by Burmese security forces on fleeing Rohingyas.

See also
 List of international border rivers
 List of rivers in Bangladesh
 Rohingya refugees in Bangladesh

References

External links

International rivers of Asia
Border rivers
Rivers of Bangladesh
Rivers of Myanmar
Bangladesh–Myanmar border
Bay of Bengal
Chittagong Division
Cox's Bazar District
Rakhine State
Territorial disputes of Bangladesh
Territorial disputes of Myanmar
Rivers of Chittagong Division